Campo arado is a 1959 Argentine film.

Cast
 Alfredo Almanza		
 Tito Alonso		
 Julio Di Palma		
 Luis Dávila		
 Ricardo Galache		
 Josefa Goldar		
 Santiago Gómez Cou		
 Chela Jordán		
 Silvia Legrand		
 René Lester		
 Claudio Martino		
 Fernanda Mistral		
 Luis Otero		
 Nelly Panizza

External links

References

1959 films
1950s Spanish-language films
Argentine black-and-white films
1950s Argentine films
Films directed by Leo Fleider